Orthalicus is a genus of land snails in the family Orthalicidae.

Species 
Species include:
 
 Orthalicus bensoni (Reeve, 1849)
 Orthalicus bifulguratus (Reeve, 1849)
 Orthalicus boucardi L. Pfeiffer, 1860
 Orthalicus capax Pilsbry, 1930
Orthalicus crosseifischeri
 Orthalicus decolor Strebel, 1882
 Orthalicus delphinus (Strebel, 1909)
Orthalicus elegans Rolle, 1895
Orthalicus euchrous
Orthalicus ferussaci E. von Martens, 1863
Orthalicus fischeri
 Orthalicus floridensis Pilsbry, 1891 – banded treesnail 
Orthalicus gruneri (Strebel, 1909)
 Orthalicus hackeri (Strebel, 1909)
Orthalicus jamaicensis
 Orthalicus leucochilus Crosse & P. Fischer, 1869
 † Orthalicus linteus (Conrad, 1871) 
 Orthalicus livens Shuttleworth, 1856
Orthalicus lividus E. von Martens, 1863
 Orthalicus longus L. Pfeiffer, 1856
Orthalicus maclurae E. von Martens, 1893
Orthalicus maculiferus (Strebel, 1909)
 Orthalicus maracaibensis (L. Pfeiffer, 1856)
 Orthalicus mars L. Pfeiffer, 1861
 Orthalicus melanocheilus (Valenciennes, 1833)
 Orthalicus miles 
 Orthalicus muelleri (Strebel, 1909)
Orthalicus naesiotes
Orthalicus nobilis  Rolle, 1895
 Orthalicus pallidus (Strebel, 1909)
 Orthalicus phlogerus (d'Orbigny, 1835)
 Orthalicus ponderosus Strebel, 1882
Orthalicus princeps (G.B. Sowerby I, 1833)
 Orthalicus prototypus Pilsbry, 1899
 Orthalicus pseudolongus (Strebel, 1909)
 Orthalicus pulchellus (Spix, 1827)
 Orthalicus quagus (Strebel, 1909)
 Orthalicus reses  (Say, 1830) – Stock Island treesnail
Orthalicus richardsoni (Strebel, 1909)
Orthalicus selectus (Strebel, 1909)
Orthalicus sphinx (Strebel, 1909)
 Orthalicus tepicensis (Strebel, 1909)
 Orthalicus torrei (McGinty, 1939)
Orthalicus turrita
Orthalicus uhdeanus E. von Martens, 1893
 Orthalicus undatus (Bruguière, 1789)
Orthalicus varius E. von Martens, 1873
Orthalicus xanthus
 Orthalicus zonatus (Strebel, 1909)
 Orthalicus zoniferus Strebel, 1882
 Orthalicus zoniferus crossei (Martens, 1893)

Species inquirendum
 Orthalicus zebra (O. F. Müller, 1774) 
 Species brought into synonymy
 *Orthalicus isabellinus Martens, 1873: synonym of Orthalicus bensoni (Reeve, 1849) (junior synonym)
 Orthalicus macandrewi G. B. Sowerby III, 1889: synonym of Sultana (Metorthalicus) macandrewi (G. B. Sowerby III, 1889) represented as Sultana macandrewi (G. B. Sowerby III, 1889)
 Orthalicus meobambensis (L. Pfeiffer, 1855): synonym of Sultana meobambensis (L. Pfeiffer, 1855) (superseded combination)
 Orthalicus pfeifferi Hidalgo, 1869: synonym of Corona pfeifferi (Hidalgo, 1869)
 Orthalicus powisianus Petit de la Saussaye, 1843: synonym of Sultana powisiana (Petit de la Saussaye, 1843) (original combination)
 Orthalicus reginaeformis Strebel, 1909: synonym of Corona perversa (Swainson, 1823) (junior synonym)
 Orthalicus sultana (Dillwyn, 1817): synonym of Sultana sultana (Dillwyn, 1817) (unaccepted combination)
 Orthalicus tricinctus  E. von Martens, 1893: synonym of Orthalicus ferussaci tricinctus E. von Martens, 1893 (basionym)
 Orthalicus trullisatus Shuttleworth, 1856: synonym of Sultana sultana (Dillwyn, 1817) (junior synonym)

References 

 Bank, R. A. (2017). Classification of the Recent terrestrial Gastropoda of the World. Last update: July 16th, 2017

External links
 Beck, H. (1837). Index molluscorum praesentis aevi musei principis augustissimi Christiani Frederici. 1-124. Hafniae
 Shuttleworth, R. J. (1856). Beiträge zur näheren Kenntniss der Mollusken. Notitiae Malacologicae. 1: 1-90, pls 1-9.

Orthalicidae